United Nations Security Council resolution 517, adopted on 4 August 1982, after recalling resolutions 508 (1982), 509 (1982), 512 (1982), 513 (1982), 515 (1982) and 516 (1982), the council again demanded an immediate cessation of military activities between Israel and Lebanon, and the withdrawal of Israeli forces from Lebanese territory.

The resolution then took note of the Palestine Liberation Organization's (PLO) decision to move its forces from Beirut, and requested the secretary-general to report back on the situation no later than 1000 hours (ET).

The resolution was adopted by 14 votes to none, with one abstention from the United States.

See also
 1982 Lebanon War
 Blue Line
 Green Line, Beirut
 Israeli–Lebanese conflict
 List of United Nations Security Council Resolutions 501 to 600 (1982–1987)
 Siege of Beirut

References
Text of the Resolution at undocs.org

External links
 

 0517
Israeli–Lebanese conflict
 0517
1982 in Israel
1982 in Lebanon
 0517
August 1982 events